WQLN (channel 54) is a PBS member television station in Erie, Pennsylvania, United States, owned by Public Broadcasting of Northwest Pennsylvania, Inc. Its studios and transmitter are located in Summit Township, south of the Erie city limits (but with an Erie mailing address).

In addition to its local viewership in Northwestern Pennsylvania and portions of nearby Ohio and New York State, WQLN is also seen in the London, Ontario area on Rogers Cable channel 8, and on other cable systems in Southwestern Ontario, Canada.

History

Groundwork for an educational television station in northwest Pennsylvania was laid in 1953 with the founding of Educational Television of Erie. Its initial effort to sign on a station was unsuccessful, but the group eventually reserved channel 54 for noncommercial use. The group, which was renamed Educational Television of Northwest Pennsylvania in 1964, pressed on until finally winning a construction permit on December 6, 1966. The group initially chose the call letters WLRN (for "Learn"), but those letters were already being used by a public radio station in Miami, Florida. They then went with their next choice, WQLN ("We Question and Learn"). On August 13, 1967; WQLN finally went on the air. WQLN-FM signed on in 1973 as an NPR member station.

WQLN is the second-smallest PBS member in Pennsylvania. Its coverage area is limited due to Erie being sandwiched between Pittsburgh to the south, Youngstown to the west and Buffalo to the north, along with Cleveland's WVIZ also being accessible in parts of the market. As a result, the station has struggled financially for most of its history. Like most PBS member stations along the U.S.–Canada border, particularly in smaller markets, it also depends heavily on viewership and donations from Canadian audiences. In WQLN's case, that extended audience is across Lake Erie in the London, Ontario area. At various times in the station's history, PBS mainstays such as Mister Rogers' Neighborhood, Nova, and The MacNeil/Lehrer NewsHour were not seen on WQLN.

The station's transmitter was knocked off-air early September 15, 2008, after its antenna and transmission line were damaged by Hurricane Ike. There was also additional damage (possibly from a prior lightning strike) to the  transmission line. The station later returned using a temporary digital antenna, making WQLN the first Erie station to become fully digital. With the impending end of analog broadcasting only four months away, the station opted not to rebuild its analog facility and broadcast exclusively in digital.

Subchannels
The station's digital signal is multiplexed:

Canadian coverage
Rogers Cable carries WQLN as the PBS station on some of its systems in Southwestern Ontario, including London, which has almost three times the population of WQLN's American coverage area. As a result of its cable carriage, a major portion of WQLN's financial contributions have come from viewers in Canada. For decades, the station has identified as "Erie/London" to acknowledge its Canadian viewership.

However, in July 2009, Rogers announced that it would be replacing both WQLN and Watertown, New York's WPBS-DT (carried in Ottawa) on its cable systems with Detroit's WTVS due to concerns over signal quality, as a result of the stations not having fiber optic signals available to Rogers. The plan by Rogers was faced with criticism from WQLN's general manager Dwight Miller, who stated that WQLN would not be able to stay on the air without the support of its Canadian viewers. Miller claimed that in recent years, the bulk of WQLN's fundraising revenue came from Canada. The threat of losing its Canadian cable viewership came as an additional unwelcome blow for WQLN which, like other PBS members in Pennsylvania, lost all state funding as of 2009. WQLN would face a loss of about $800,000 of state funding.

On July 30, 2009, Rogers announced that WQLN would be retained on its Southwestern Ontario systems, as a result of WQLN providing a fiber optic connection to Rogers' London headend.

References

External links

QLN (TV)
PBS member stations
Television channels and stations established in 1967
1967 establishments in Pennsylvania